Gemini is an application-layer internet communication protocol for accessing remote documents, similar to the Hypertext Transfer Protocol (HTTP) and Gopher. It comes with a special document format, commonly referred to as "gemtext", which allows linking to other documents.

History

The Gemini project was started in June 2019 by Solderpunk. Additional work has been done by an informal community of users. According to Solderpunk's FAQ, Gemini is not intended to replace Gopher or HTTP, but to co-exist with them. Much of the development happened on the Gemini mailing list until the list disappeared end of 2021 due to a hardware issue. The creation of the Usenet newsgroup comp.infosystems.gemini in October 2021 was the first new newsgroup in the Big Eight hierarchy in eight years.

Design 

The Gemini specification defines both the Gemini protocol and a native file format for that protocol, analogous to HTML for HTTP, known as "gemtext". The design is inspired by Gopher, but with modernisation such as mandatory use of Transport Layer Security (TLS) for connections and a hypertext format as native content type.

The design is deliberately not easily extensible, in order to meet a project goal of simplicity.

Protocol 

Gemini is designed within the framework of the Internet protocol suite and like HTTP/S, Gemini functions as a request–response protocol in the client–server computing model. A Gemini server should listen on TCP port 1965. A Gemini browser, for example, may be the client and an application running on a computer hosting a Gemini site may be the server. The client sends a Gemini request message to the server, and the server sends back a response message. Gemini uses a separate connection to the same server for every resource request.

Gemini mandates the use of TLS with privacy-related features and trust on first use (TOFU) verification being strongly suggested.

Gemini resources are identified and located on the network by Uniform Resource Locators (URLs), using the URI scheme gemini://. A Gemini request consists only of such a URL, terminated by CRLF; the header of a Gemini response consists of a two-digit status code, a space, and a "meta" field, also terminated by CRLF. If the server is successful in finding the requested file, the "meta" field is the MIME type of the returned file and after the header follows the file data.

Gemtext format

Gemtext format is line-oriented and the first three characters of a line determine its type. The syntax includes markup for headlines, flat list items, pre-formatted text, quotes and link lines. As with HTTP hypertext, URIs are encoded as hyperlinks to form interlinked hypertext documents in the Gemini "web", which users refer to as Geminispace.

Geminispace 
"Geminispace" denotes the whole of the public resources that are published on the Internet by the Gemini community via the Gemini protocol. Thus, Gemini spans an alternative communication web, with hypertext documents, including hyperlinks to other resources easily accessible to the user.

 Geminispace consists of around 2300 online known Gemini appearances ("capsules") identified by crawling over 490,000 URIs.

Software 

Gemini-to-HTTP proxy server gateways such as Mozz.us, Vulpes Proxy, and ondollo can be used to by web browsers otherwise not supporting Gemini.

Reception 
Gemini is praised for its simplicity but criticized for "excluding people who use ordinary web browsers". Gemini's usefulness has been said to be "dependent on the kinds of content available on Gemini and whether it appeals or not". Stéphane Bortzmeyer has said Gemini is retro but with modern features.

See also

 Text-based web browser

References

External links 
 Official website
 Gopher, Gemini, and the rise of the small Internet: Beyond the Web in Linux Magazine

Application layer protocols
Internet protocols
Network protocols
Accessible information
Hypertext
Internet properties established in 2019